Robert Dennis McFadden (born February 11, 1937) is an American journalist who has worked for The New York Times since 1961. He won a Pulitzer Prize in 1996.

Biography
McFadden was born in Milwaukee, and raised in both Chicago and the small town of Cumberland, Wisconsin. He attended the University of Wisconsin–Eau Claire, and graduated from the journalism school of the University of Wisconsin–Madison in 1960 with a B.S. in Journalism. He moved to New York City in 1961 with the intention of applying to only one newspaper—the only paper for which he wanted to work—and his hopes were realized when he was soon hired by The New York Times. His literary writing style, strict adherence to journalistic principles, and tireless ability to "beat the deadline" won him accolades as both a writer and journalist, and he has since received numerous awards for excellence in journalism. McFadden, a celebrated Senior Writer, has remained at the Times for over 60 years, and continues his work through the present day. In 1996, he won the annual Pulitzer Prize for Spot News Reporting, citing "his highly skilled writing and reporting on deadline during the year" (1995). McFadden and his wife Judith have a son named Nolan, and live in Manhattan, New York.

Career
From 1957 to 1958, McFadden was a reporter for The Wisconsin Rapids Daily Tribune. From 1958 to 1959, he was a reporter for The Wisconsin State Journal in Madison and after he graduated from University of Wisconsin–Madison, worked for The Cincinnati Enquirer. In 1961, he was hired by The New York Times, where he remained for the next six decades as a reporter and rewrite man. His writing has covered a wide range of topics including plane crashes, hurricanes, strikes, blackouts, government affairs, health, crime, transportation, politics, education, the environment, and mass media. As of May 2022 he is listed as senior writer on the newspaper's Obituaries desk.

Awards and honors
McFadden has received 18 major journalistic awards and seven New York Times Publisher’s Awards,  He was named a Senior Writer in January 1990.
 New York Press Club's Byline Award for Spot News Reporting in 1973, 1974, 1980, 1987 and 1989
 New York Newspaper Guild's Page One Award for Local Reporting
 Peter Kihss Award of the New York Society of Silurians
 University of Wisconsin–Madison Chancellor's Award for Distinguished Service to Journalism and Mass Communication

Bibliography

References

External links
 

1937 births
Living people
American male journalists
The New York Times writers
Pulitzer Prize for Breaking News Reporting winners
University of Wisconsin–Madison School of Journalism & Mass Communication alumni
University of Wisconsin–Eau Claire alumni
Writers from Milwaukee
Journalists from Wisconsin
The Cincinnati Enquirer people
People from Cumberland, Wisconsin
Obituary writers